The Death of Kevin Carter: Casualty of the Bang Bang Club, also known as The Life of Kevin Carter, is a 2004 American documentary short film about the suicide of South African photojournalist Kevin Carter. The film is produced and directed by Dan Krauss as a master's project at the UC Berkeley Graduate School of Journalism.

It describes how Carter, who won the Pulitzer Prize for a photograph of an emaciated African girl being stalked by a vulture, became depressed by the carnage he witnessed as a photographer in war-torn places. In addition, he was devastated by the death of Ken Oosterbroek, a close friend and colleague who was shot and killed while working in the township of Thokoza.

It received a nomination for the Academy Award for Documentary Short Subject.

Reception 
In 2006, Maureen Ryan called it "provocative", and noted that it was "surprising(ly) thorough" for a film only a half-hour long, with its short running time being its only weakness.

See also
 Bang-Bang Club

References

External links
 
 

2004 films
2004 short documentary films
American short documentary films
2004 independent films
American independent films
Documentary films about journalists
Documentary films about suicide
Documentary films about photographers
Films directed by Dan Krauss
Bang-Bang Club
2000s English-language films
2000s American films